Champlain Place, also known as Champlain Mall and corporately styled as CF Champlain, is a shopping centre located in Dieppe, New Brunswick, Canada.  It is the largest single-building shopping centre in Atlantic Canada by floor space.

Stores
The mall has over 150 stores and services. The anchor tenants are:
 Walmart
 Sobeys
 Toys "R" Us
 Sport Chek
 H&M
 Urban Planet
 Linen Chest

History

Major expansions
The site began as a Sears store; however, in 1974, it was expanded to include Champlain Place Shopping Centre, including where Walmart is now (then Woolco) and to the west (then Dominion and Consumers Distributing).

Other
Until September 2008, customers of Champlain Place were allowed to bring their shopping carts with them anywhere within the common areas of the mall. Carts have since been banned from use in the common areas, and restricted to grocery and large department stores.
Champlain Place is named after Samuel de Champlain, a French explorer of the region.

See also
 List of largest enclosed shopping malls in Canada
 List of shopping malls in Canada
 Bass Pro Complex (Dieppe)

References

External links
 Champlain Place Website

Shopping malls in New Brunswick
Shopping malls established in 1974
Buildings and structures in Dieppe, New Brunswick
Tourist attractions in Dieppe, New Brunswick
Cadillac Fairview